Thomas Bertie "Bert" Jenkins (first ¼ 1885 – 4 February 1943) was a Welsh rugby union, and professional rugby league footballer who played in the 1900s, 1910s and 1920s.

Background
Bert Jenkins was born in Troed-y-rhiw, Wales (his birth was registered in Merthyr Tydfil district), and his death aged 57 was registered in Merthyr Tydfil district, Wales.

Playing career

International honours
Bert Jenkins won caps for Wales (RL) while at Wigan in 1908 against New Zealand, and in 1909 against England, and won caps for Great Britain (RL) while at Wigan in 1908 against New Zealand (3 matches), and Australia (3 matches), in 1909 against Australia (2 matches), on the 1910 Great Britain Lions tour of Australia and New Zealand against Australia, Australasia (2 matches), and New Zealand, in 1911 against Australia, in 1912 against Australia, and in 1914 against Australia, and New Zealand.

Jenkins captained the Great Britain team in the first ever test match between The Lions and Australia at the Park Royal Ground in London on 12 December 1908. The match ended in a 22-all draw. Although he also played in the last two tests of the three test series, the Great Britain captaincy was taken over by Salford centre Johnny Thomas.

County honours
Bert Jenkins won cap(s) for Lancashire (RL) while at Wigan.

Championship final appearances
Bert Jenkins played right-, i.e. number 3, in Wigan's 7–3 victory over Oldham in the Championship Final during the 1908–09 season at The Willows, Salford on Saturday 1 May 1909.

County League appearances
Bert Jenkins played in Wigan's victories in the Lancashire County League during the 1908–09 season, 1910–11 season, 1911–12 season, 1912–13 season, 1913–14 season and 1914–15 season.

County Cup Final appearances
Bert Jenkins played , i.e. number 13 (in a 15-player team) in Wigan's 0-0 draw with Leigh in the 1905 Lancashire County Cup Final during the 1905–06 season at Wheater's Field, Broughton on Saturday 2 December 1905, played , i.e. number 13 (in a 15-player team), and scored a try, in the 8-0 victory over Leigh in the 1905 Lancashire County Cup Final replay during the 1905–06 season at Wheater's Field, Broughton on Monday 11 December 1905, played right-, i.e. number 3 (in a 13-player team) in the 10-9 victory over Oldham in the 1908 Lancashire County Cup Final during the 1908–09 season at Wheater's Field, Broughton on Saturday 19 December 1908, played right-, i.e. number 3 (in a 13-player team) in the 22-5 victory over Leigh in the 1909 Lancashire County Cup Final during the 1909–10 season at Wheater's Field, Broughton on Saturday 27 November 1909, and played right-, i.e. number 3 (in a 13-player team) in the 21-5 victory over Leigh in the 1912 Lancashire County Cup Final during the 1912–13 season at Weaste (The Willows, Salford?) on Wednesday 11 December 1912.

Notable tour matches
Bert Jenkins played right-, i.e. number 3, and scored a try in Wigan's 12-8 victory over New Zealand at Central Park, Wigan, on Saturday 9 November 1907, played right-, and scored a try in the 10-7 victory over Australia at Central Park, Wigan, on Saturday 9 January 1909, played right-, and scored a try in the 16-8 victory over Australia at Central Park, Wigan, on Wednesday 20 January 1909, and played right- in the 7-2 victory over Australia at Central Park, Wigan, on Saturday 28 October 1911.

Testimonial match
A Testimonial match at Wigan was shared by; Bert Jenkins, Dick Ramsdale and Johnny Thomas.

Club career

Bert Jenkins made his début for Troedyrhiw RFC aged sixteen, he transferred to Mountain Ash at the start of the 1904/05 season, he changed rugby football codes from rugby union to rugby league, and transferred to Wigan during December 1904, he made his début for Wigan in the 10-7 victory over Runcorn RFC at Central Park, Wigan on Saturday 10 December 1904, he scored his first try for Wigan in the 20-2 victory over Oldham at Central Park, Wigan on Saturday 15 April 1905, he scored his last try for Wigan in the 11-3 victory over Rochdale Hornets at Central Park, Wigan on Wednesday 17 March 1920, and he played his last for match for Wigan in the  2-10 defeat by Leeds at Headingley Rugby Stadium, Leeds on Saturday 11 September 1920.

During Bert Jenkins' time at Wigan, they also won the South West Lancashire League in 1904–05 and 1905–06.

Bert Jenkins is one of less than twenty Welshmen to have scored more than 200-tries in their rugby league career.

References

Bibliography

External links
!Great Britain Statistics at englandrl.co.uk (statistics currently missing due to not having appeared for both Great Britain, and England)
Statistics at wigan.rlfans.com

1885 births
1943 deaths
Footballers who switched code
Great Britain national rugby league team captains
Great Britain national rugby league team players
Lancashire rugby league team players
Mountain Ash RFC players
Rugby league centres
Rugby league players from Merthyr Tydfil County Borough
Rugby union players from Merthyr Tydfil County Borough
Wales national rugby league team players
Welsh rugby league players
Welsh rugby union players
Wigan Warriors players